Frederick Charles Jones (12 September 1927 – 9 July 2019) was an English actor who had an extensive career in television, theatre and cinema productions for almost sixty years. In theatre, he was best known for originating the role of Sir in The Dresser; in film, he was best known for his role as the showman Bytes in The Elephant Man (1980); and in television, he was best known for playing Sandy Thomas in the ITV soap opera Emmerdale from 2005 to 2018.

Early life
Jones was born on 12 September 1927 in Dresden, a suburb of the town of Longton, Stoke-on-Trent, the son of Ida Elizabeth (née Goodwin) and Charles Edward Jones. Charles was a porcelain thrower, Ida a clerk and pub pianist. He worked briefly at Creda, the consumer electrical goods vendors, in Longton before he joined the British Ceramic Research Association in Penkhull, where he worked for ten years. His girlfriend at the time suggested he join a drama course, after which he joined repertory theatre in Shelton, Staffordshire, and other local theatre groups.

Career
Jones won a scholarship to the Rose Bruford Training College of Speech and Drama—where he shed his Midlands accent. He spent time in Lincoln rep before making his London debut in 1962 with the Royal Shakespeare Company (RSC), performing at the Arts Theatre in Afore Night Come. According to the theatre critic Michael Coveney, Jones was "immediately one of the ... [RSC's] most distinctive character actors". In 1963 he played Stanley in the Harold Pinter-directed revival of The Birthday Party in 1963, followed by Maxim Gorky's play Lower Depths at the Aldwych Theatre in 1964. In 1964 he appeared as Cucurucu in the Peter Brook-directed production of Marat/Sade in a production that included Glenda Jackson, Ian Richardson and Patrick Magee. He reprised his role for the Broadway production, and again for the film version (1967).

He became more widely known to British audiences in 1968, after his appearance in the six-episode television series The Caesars, in which he played Claudius. For this role, he won the award for the "World's Best Television Actor of the Year" at the 1969 Monte-Carlo Television Festival. In 1970 he took the eponymous role in Charles Wood's television film The Emergence Of Anthony Purdy Esquire Farmer's Labourer, directed by Patrick Dromgoole for Harlech TV. Other television work included the 1968 BBC three-part adaptation of Cold Comfort Farm (he also appeared in the 1995 film adaptation), the 1978 series Pennies from Heaven and the ITV children's programme The Ghosts of Motley Hall (1976–1978). His cinema career developed, with support roles in the Cold War thriller Firefox playing an MI6 spy chief, and in the director David Lynch's films The Elephant Man (1980), Dune (1984) and Wild at Heart (1990). In the 1980s series, The District Nurse, he played the senior partner in a father-and-son medical practice in 1930s Wales, with the unrelated Nicholas Jones as his son.

In 1980 he appeared as Sir in Ronald Harwood's play The Dresser, first in Manchester, then transferring to the London stage; he later reprised the role on BBC Radio 4's The Monday Play in 1993. Coveney said of Jones in the role: "No subsequent performance in The Dresser – not Albert Finney in the 1983 film, nor Anthony Hopkins on television in 2015, nor Ken Stott in the West End in 2016 – matched the rumbling thunder of Jones". Apart from a brief spell in 2001, Jones retired from stage work in the early 1990s.

Jones played the character Sandy Thomas in ITV's Emmerdale from 2005 to 2018, when he left the programme. He said he had been offered a contract extension but he declined as he felt it was the right time to move on.

Jones also performed extensively in radio drama, including:
 "Mr. Pickwick" in the 1977 adaptation of Charles Dickens' The Pickwick Papers,
 "The Player" in the 1978 adaptation of Tom Stoppard's Rosencrantz and Guildenstern are Dead
 "The Waiter" in the 1971 adaptation of George Bernard Shaw's You Never Can Tell
 "Albert Edward, Prince of Wales" in Lydia Ragosin's Bertie
 "Rodin" in Jonathan Smith's Abandoned
 "The Scribe" in the 1992 adaptation of Bruce Bedford's The Gibson
 "Charlie" in A. L. Kennedy's Like An Angel
 "Sir Morton Makepeace" in Martyn Read's The Folly
 "The Artist" in the adaptations of the Gormenghast novels by Mervyn Peake.

Personal life
Jones married actress Jennifer Heslewood in 1965. They had three sons, actor Toby Jones, Rupert, a director, and Casper, an actor.

Jones was a Stoke City fan.

Jones died on 9 July 2019 at the age of 91 in Bicester, Oxfordshire, after a short illness. Following his death several of the cast members from Emmerdale paid tribute to Jones. On 11 July both episodes of a double-bill of the soap were dedicated to Jones.

Filmography

Film

Television

Notes and references

Notes

References

External links
 
 

1927 births
2019 deaths
English male film actors
English male soap opera actors
English male stage actors
20th-century English male actors
21st-century English male actors
Actors from Staffordshire
Alumni of Rose Bruford College
People from Dresden, Staffordshire